Kim Seung-gu (born May 20, 1981) is a South Korean épée fencer. He won two medals (one gold and one silver), as a member of the South Korean fencing team, at the 2006 Asian Games in Doha, Qatar.

Kim represented South Korea at the 2008 Summer Olympics in Beijing, where he competed in two épée events. For his first event, the men's individual épée, Kim defeated South Africa's Sello Maduma in the first preliminary round, before losing out his next match to Hungary's Géza Imre, with a sudden death score of 14–15. Few days later, he joined with his fellow fencers and teammates Jung Jin-sun and Kim Won-jin, for the men's team épée. Kim and his team, however, lost the seventh place match to the Ukrainian team (led by Dmytro Chumak), with a total score of 39 touches.

References

External links
Profile – FIE
NBC 2008 Olympics profile

1981 births
South Korean male épée fencers
Korea National Sport University alumni
Fencers at the 2006 Asian Games
Asian Games medalists in fencing
Medalists at the 2006 Asian Games
Asian Games gold medalists for South Korea
Asian Games bronze medalists for South Korea
Olympic fencers of South Korea
Fencers at the 2008 Summer Olympics
Living people